Wolfgang Ziebart (born 30 January 1950 in Hannover) is a German automotive and electronics industry executive.

Career
After receiving his Abitur, Wolfgang Ziebart studied mechanical engineering at the Technical University of Munich where he received his Diploma and PhD (Dr.-Ing.) in 1973 and 1976, respectively. Ziebart started his career  in 1977 with the car manufacturer BMW. After a spell at Artega Automobile, a German electric sports car manufacturer, he joined Jaguar Land Rover as head of product development in 2013.

Personal life
Ziebart has been married to his wife Iris since 1975 and is father of three children. Both of Ziebart's brothers have doctoral degrees and one of them has earned the title of professor. His father Prof. Dr.‑Ing. Erwin Ziebart, also a former CEO of an automobile supplier, died on 19 August 2007.

References

BMW people
Jaguar Land Rover
1950 births
Living people
Technical University of Munich alumni
German automotive engineers
Engineers from Hanover